This is a list of the most senior Privy Counsellors in length of service of England, Great Britain and the United Kingdom since 1708.

External links
 

Privy Council of the United Kingdom